Kutch Express is a 2023 Gujarati drama film directed by Viral Shah. It stars Ratna Pathak Shah, Manasi Parekh, Dharmendra Gohil, Darsheel Safary and Viraf Patel in lead roles. It is produced by Parthiv Gohil and Manasi Parekh, and distributed by Coconut Movies Release. The music is composed by Sachin-Jigar. The story of the film developed by Rahul Malick, Screenplay has been written by Rahul Malick, Karan Bhanushali,& Viraf Patel, Dialogues have been written by Raam Mori

Cast 
 Ratna Pathak Shah as Baiji
 Manasi Parekh as Monghi
 Dharmendra Gohil as Dharmesh 
 Viraf Patel as Madan
 Darsheel Safary as Avinash
 Heena Varde as Mamta
 Reeva Rachh as Stuti
 Kumkum Das as Shobhna
 Margi Desai as Kanku
 Bhumika Barot as Jivi
 Denisha Ghumra as Kanchan 
 Kaushambi Bhatt as Diwali

Production 
It is produced by Parthiv Gohil and Manasi Parekh under banner of Soul Sutra. It is shot in Kutch district, Gujarat, India. Darsheel Safary, Ratna Pathak Shah and Viraf Patel debuted in Gujarati cinema with the film.

Soundtrack

Tracklist

Marketing and release 
The poster was revealed on 9 November 2022, the teaser of the film was released on 28 November 2022 and the trailer was released on 6 December 2022. The film will be released on 6 January 2023.

Reception
Mid-Day Gujarati praised the chemistry of Mansi Gohil and Ratna Pathak Shah as well as dialogues by Ram Mori and rated the film 3 out of 5 stars.

See also
 List of Gujarati films of 2023

References

External links 
 

2023 films
2020s Gujarati-language films
Films shot in Gujarat